OVC can stand for:

 Office for Victims of Crime, part of the U.S. Department of Justice
 Open Voting Consortium, a nonprofit group advocating for open-source electronic voting technology
 Ontario Veterinary College
 Ohio Valley Conference, an NCAA Division I college athletic conference
 Orphans and vulnerable children